Travis Gaertner (born January 16, 1980) is a Canadian-American actuary. He previously competed with Team Canada in the Paralympic Games in wheelchair basketball, where he won a gold medal at the 2000 Summer Paralympics and the 2004 Summer Paralympics.

Early life and education
Gaertner was born on January 16, 1980, in Kitchener, Ontario, Canada to parents Diana and Jonathan. He was born with a congenital disease causing him to be born without a left and half a right leg. Until he was in fifth grade, Gaertner used a prosthetic leg but eventually switched to a wheelchair for better mobility. When Gaertner was twelve years old, Jonathan died of cancer and he decided to take up wheelchair basketball. By Grade 6, he qualified for the Manitoba Ramblers of the Manitoba Wheelchair Sports Association, and later joined the Manitoba senior wheelchair team. His play caught the attention of a Canadian coach who invited him to try out for the Canadian Paralympic team.

Career
Gaertner joined Team Canada in 1998 and was selected to play for Canada at the 2000 Summer Paralympics. After returning to the University of Illinois at Urbana–Champaign with a gold medal, he helped the Manitoba Rolling Thunder win their first Canadian Wheelchair Basketball League championship title. In 2002, he was one of four students who received the Wooddy Scholarship Award as someone who earned both academic and athletic acclaim.

Later, he helped the Winnipeg Thunder win their third consecutive Canadian Wheelchair Basketball League championship title. In 2004, Gaertner was named to Team Canada to compete at the 2004 Summer Paralympics where he won gold.

Gaertner earned his American citizenship in 2012 and qualified to compete with Team USA. In May 2017, Gaertner began practicing handcycling under the coaching of Will Groulx and Tom Davis.  In 2018, he was named to the U.S. Paralympics Cycling Team for the 2018 UCI Road World Championships.

References

External links
Paralympic profile

1980 births
Living people
Sportspeople from Kitchener, Ontario
Wheelchair basketball players at the 2004 Summer Paralympics
Wheelchair basketball players at the 2000 Summer Paralympics
Paralympic gold medalists for Canada
Medalists at the 2000 Summer Paralympics
Medalists at the 2004 Summer Paralympics
Canadian men's wheelchair basketball players
People with acquired American citizenship
Paralympic medalists in wheelchair basketball
Paralympic wheelchair basketball players of Canada